R. B. Udhaya Kumar is an Indian politician and Member of the Legislative Assembly of Tamil Nadu from Tirumangalam constituency.

Kumar was sacked as Minister for Information Technology in November 2011 as part of the third cabinet reshuffle in a five-month period by Chief Minister Jayalalithaa.

References 

All India Anna Dravida Munnetra Kazhagam politicians
Living people
Year of birth missing (living people)
Tamil Nadu MLAs 2016–2021
Tamil Nadu MLAs 2021–2026